689 Zita is a minor planet orbiting the Sun. It was named after Zita of Bourbon-Parma, the last empress of Austria-Hungary.

References

External links
 
 

Background asteroids
Zita
Zita
CX:-type asteroids (Tholen)
19090912